Ban Dong may refer to:

 Ban Dong, Chat Trakan
Ban Dong, Lampang